Canadian National 89 is a 2-6-0 "Mogul" type steam locomotive originally built by the Canadian Locomotive Company in February 1910 for the Canadian National Railway. It is now owned and operated by the Strasburg Rail Road outside of Strasburg, Pennsylvania where it resides today for use on excursion trains.

History
No. 89 was originally built in February 1910 by the Canadian Locomotive Company in Kingston, Ontario for the Grand Trunk Railway as No. 1009. It has a wheel arrangement of 2-6-0. In 1919, it was renumbered to No. 911. In 1923, the Grand Trunk was merged into the Canadian National Railway (CN) with No. 911 being one of the thousands of locomotives working for this new railroad. In 1951, No. 911 was renumbered to No. 89. Most of 89's career on the CN is unknown; it appears that it spent the latter part of its working life in Quebec before being retired in late 1958 and being stored in a deadline of locomotives in Montreal.

In 1961, No. 89 was purchased by New England seafood magnate and steam locomotive collector F. Nelson Blount and moved to North Walpole, New Hampshire, in the United States. No. 89 found a home in the former Boston & Maine North Walpole roundhouse and starting in 1965, would begin operating on the Green Mountain Railroad and would be moved to across the Connecticut River to Bellows Falls, Vermont. No. 89 quickly became Blount's favorite locomotive and he would often be found at the throttle until his death in 1967.

In July 1972, the Green Mountain Railroad sold No. 89 to the Strasburg Rail Road outside of Strasburg, Pennsylvania. This is a linear village along the Great Conestoga Road, stretching about two miles along path later known as the Strasburg Road. The population was 2,809 at the 2010 census. The move from Bellows Falls to Strasburg was overseen by Strasburg employee Linn Moedinger. During a stopover in Penn Central's Buttonwood Yard in Wilkes-Barre, No. 89 was stranded when Hurricane Agnes caused the Susquehanna River to flood much of the area. No. 89 spent several days submerged in the rail yard but emerged with little to no damage.

Upon arrival to Strasburg, No. 89 made its first run on March 17, 1973. During its first year, No. 89 faced east and would remain that way until the turntable at the Railroad Museum of Pennsylvania was installed in 1973. No. 89 frequently operated in tandem with Pennsylvania Railroad 4-4-0 No. 1223 on Strasburg's half-hour trains until it was taken out of service in the early 1980s for major repairs. During these repairs which lasted the majority of the decade, No. 89 was completely rebuilt from the ground up including major boiler and running gear work. Emerging from its rebuild in November 1988, No. 89 returned to pulling the half-hour trains, being joined by former Norfolk & Western 4-8-0 No. 475 in 1993. In October 2003, No. 89 was modified and repainted to its 1950s Canadian National appearance with the tilted monogram logo. In 2008, No. 89's tender logo was re-lettered to read "Strasburg Rail Road," in keeping with Strasburg's policy of historical authenticity.

In popular culture 
The locomotive appears at east Strasburg station in the 2012 History channel series The Men Who Built America in multiple episodes.
In 2013, the locomotive appeared in a live action segment of an episode of Daniel Tiger's Neighborhood titled "All Aboard." The Segment was filmed in October 2012.
In 2022, the engine appeared in an episode of The Gilded Age (TV series) entitled "Charity Has Two Functions," with an unlettered tender.

Gallery

See also
 Great Western 90
 Norfolk and Western 475
 Western Coal and Coke 1
 Canadian National 1009
 Canadian National 3254
 Canadian National 7312
 Canadian National 7470

References

External link

0089
2-6-0 locomotives
CLC locomotives
Individual locomotives of Canada
Preserved steam locomotives of Canada
Standard gauge locomotives of Canada
Railway locomotives introduced in 1910
Standard gauge locomotives of the United States
Preserved steam locomotives of Pennsylvania